2wink Australia is an Australian men's underwear and swimwear apparel brand based in Perth, Western Australia. The apparel is sold in 30 countries.

History
2wink Australia was founded by friends Eddie Jones and Mark Turner in 2005, after being disappointed with other brands of underwear that were expensive and didn't hold up well. The name 2wink was created from the concept of "winking" one's eye.  In 2010, Carl McNeill officially bought out Eddie Jones's interest in the company.  

Since beginning the company with A$30,000 in 2005, 2wink Australia has gone on to pull in over A$2 million in 2009, delivering to over 30 countries (including Australia, France, Italy, USA, United Kingdom, Germany, Spain, Singapore and Japan), and creates 80,000 pairs of underwear per annum. The company expects to double its sales as export opportunities become available to the business.

In 2009, the company made the strategic decision to transfer all of its manufacturing from China to Western Australia, after observing the uproar caused by Pacific Brands, the maker of Bonds, taking their manufacturing overseas.

2wink Australia released its first range of men's swimwear in 2011.

Products
2wink Australia has 10 different ranges of Australian-made underwear available, including Hung Downunder, 70s, 80s, walkabout, Sweet As! Candy, LOADED, LOADED Gen2, Mechanic, Predator, Rage, and previous ranges, including The Tanga, Longbox, Glovebox, Minibox, Hot Angel, Cool Devil and Space Cadet. The brand is also developing additional new ranges.

Some of the brand's variations include Graffiti Longbox, Graffiti Glovebox, Graffiti Minibox, Longbox Split and Loaded Gen2 in cherry and white.

The company is particularly well known for its LOADED range, which features an inside secret pouch to hide a condom, promoting safe-sex practices between individuals.

2wink Australia is also known for its uniquely themed underwear ranges, or collections, most of the time related specifically to elements of the design of the waistband. The 'walkabout' range was designed by an Aboriginal designer, and the brand's newest swim wear ranges are named after five of the best known Australian actors, Russell Crowe, Hugh Jackman, Heath Ledger, Ryan Kwanten and Sam Worthington.

Operations
The company is headquartered in Dianella, a suburb of Perth, whereas all of its products are made in China.

See also

 List of swimwear brands

References

Clothing brands of Australia
Clothing companies established in 2005
Swimwear brands
Underwear brands
Companies based in Perth, Western Australia
Australian companies established in 2005